The Japanese fluvial sculpin (Cottus pollux) is a species of freshwater ray-finned fish belonging to the family Cottidae, the typical sculpins. It is endemic to Japan, where it inhabits mountain streams in Honshu, Shikoku, and Kyushu. It reaches a maximum length of 15.0 cm (5.9 in) .  It is also known as the Japanese bullhead.

References

Fish of Japan
Cottus (fish)
Fish described in 1873
Taxa named by Albert Günther